Herpetogramma cynaralis is a species of moth of the family Crambidae. It is found in Japan, Sri Lanka, Indonesia (the Sula Islands) and Australia, where it has been recorded from New South Wales and Queensland.

The larvae feed on Stephania japonica var. discolor. They roll the leaves of their host plant and secure them with silken filaments. Pupation takes place within this leaf roll.

References

Moths described in 1859
Herpetogramma
Moths of Asia
Moths of Australia